Kuchek Astajiq (also Romanized as Kūchek Astājīq) is a village in Katul Rural District, in the Central District of Aliabad County, Golestan Province, Iran. At the 2006 census, its population was 2,086, in 441 families.

References 

Populated places in Aliabad County